

About 
The Adventist University of Africa is a Seventh-day Adventist university that offers postgraduate education with a mandate to train leaders to serve both the Church and Society. The University is accredited by the Commission for University Education, Kenya and the Accrediting Association of Seventh-day Adventist Schools, Colleges, and Universities.

Schools and Programmes offered 
Adventist University of Africa (AUA) has two Schools: the Theological Seminary and the School of Postgraduate Studies. 
The Seminary offers the following theological programmes: 
 Master of Arts in Pastoral Theology
 Master of Arts in Missiology
 Master of Arts in Biblical and Theological Studies 
 Master of Chaplaincy 
 Master of Divinity
 Doctor of Ministry (DMin)
 Doctor of Philosophy, Biblical and Theological Studies

While the School of Postgraduate Studies offers the following programmes: 
 Master of Arts in Leadership
 Master of Business Administration (MBA)
 Master of Public Health (MPH)
 Master of Science in Applied Computer Science
 Doctor of Philosophy, Leadership

Location 
Adventist University of Africa has its headquarters in East-Central Africa Division of the Seventh-day Adventist Church, Nairobi, Kenya. The courses are taught at various extension instructional locations such as Helderberg College, Valley View University, University of Eastern Africa, Baraton, Solusi University, and Babcock University.

See also

Andrews University 
Adventist International Institute of Advanced Studies
Bugema University
University of Arusha

References

External links
 

Universities and colleges affiliated with the Seventh-day Adventist Church
Education in Africa
Universities and colleges in Kenya
2006 establishments in Kenya
Educational institutions established in 2006